Joan Ángel Román Ollè, also known as Goku, is a Spanish professional footballer who plays for Polish club Podbeskidzie Bielsko-Biała as a left winger.

Club career

Early years
Born in Reus, Tarragona, Catalonia, Román began playing football with local UE Barri Santes Creus before joining the youth ranks of RCD Espanyol at the age of 10. Six years later he signed for Manchester City, playing exclusively with the reserves during his spell and being called up once by the first team, in a 3–2 win against Sporting CP in the round of 16 of the UEFA Europa League where he remained an unused substitute.

Barcelona B
On 27 June 2012, Román returned to his homeland after signing a three-year contract with FC Barcelona B. He made his professional debut on 8 September away to CD Guadalajara, replacing Sergio Araujo for the final 24 minutes of the 1–0 Segunda División win. In his next game, on 13 October, again off the bench, he scored his first goal to conclude a 3–0 victory over Sporting de Gijón at the Mini Estadi; he made 22 appearances in his first season, also netting on 13 January 2013 in a 4–2 home defeat of Xerez CD within a minute of entering the field of play.

On 31 January 2014, after adding another couple of goals in 16 second-tier matches over the first half of 2013–14, Román was loaned to La Liga side Villarreal CF for the remainder of the campaign. Eight days later he made his debut in the latter competition, playing the final 28 minutes of a 4–2 away loss to Real Madrid in place of Moi Gómez. His only other appearance was on 5 April, starting in a 1–0 defeat at Atlético Madrid.

Román returned to his parent club for 2014–15, playing 32 games en route to an eventual relegation. He totalled five goals over its course, including two on 23 May in a 4–2 away defeat against UD Las Palmas where he featured only 22 minutes.

Braga
After his contract expired at Barcelona, Román moved to S.C. Braga in Portugal, signing a three-year deal on 28 June 2015. He made his Primeira Liga debut on the first day of the season, scoring the winner in a 2–1 home win over C.D. Nacional seven minutes after coming on.

After playing only six more games in any competition, Román was loaned to Nacional alongside teammate Rodrigo Pinho on 18 January 2016, until the end of the campaign. In August, he moved to Śląsk Wrocław in Poland's Ekstraklasa on the same basis, for the full campaign.

Later career
Román left Braga in January 2018, joining AEL Limassol until the end of the Cypriot First Division season. Just over a year later, he was back in Poland's top flight with Miedź Legnica. His contract ended following their relegation, and he signed for Panetolikos F.C. of Super League Greece in July 2019.

Career statistics

References

External links

1993 births
Living people
People from Reus
Sportspeople from the Province of Tarragona
Spanish footballers
Footballers from Catalonia
Association football wingers
Manchester City F.C. players
La Liga players
Segunda División players
FC Barcelona Atlètic players
Villarreal CF players
Primeira Liga players
S.C. Braga players
C.D. Nacional players
Ekstraklasa players
I liga players
Śląsk Wrocław players
Miedź Legnica players
Podbeskidzie Bielsko-Biała players
Cypriot First Division players
AEL Limassol players
Super League Greece players
Panetolikos F.C. players
Spain youth international footballers
Spanish expatriate footballers
Expatriate footballers in England
Expatriate footballers in Portugal
Expatriate footballers in Poland
Expatriate footballers in Cyprus
Expatriate footballers in Greece
Spanish expatriate sportspeople in England
Spanish expatriate sportspeople in Portugal
Spanish expatriate sportspeople in Poland
Spanish expatriate sportspeople in Cyprus
Spanish expatriate sportspeople in Greece